First to Fight is a 1967 American Technicolor Warner Bros. war film starring Chad Everett, Marilyn Devin, making her film debut, Dean Jagger, Bobby Troup and James Best. Based loosely on the story of United States Marine Gunnery Sergeant  John "Manila" Basilone, who later went back into action and died at Iwo Jima.

The title of First to Fight was derived from the US military practice of sending in United States Marines first in attacks. The film features an early career appearance by future Academy Award winner Gene Hackman as Sgt. Tweed, already having starring in a breakthrough role in Bonnie and Clyde (1967).

Plot
In 1942, a force of American Marines are attacked by the Japanese in the jungles at Guadalcanal.  Sergeant "Shanghai" Jack Conell (Chad Everett)  is the sole survivor of his squad, and when he makes it back to his own lines, he is given a field promotion to Lieutenant and awarded the Medal of Honor by Lt. Col. Baseman (Dean Jagger).

Sent back home on a War Bonds Tour, Connell is reluctant to trade on his heroism and does not consider himself a hero, just a survivor. When he returns home, despite efforts of his friends to find him dates, he falls in love with Peggy Sandford (Marilyn Devin) and the two are married. Her fiance had been killed and Peggy extracts a promise from Connell that he will not go back into the war. For a time, he trains new recruits at Camp Pendleton Marine Base, but is emotionally distraught as he comes to think of himself as a slacker and treats his trainees harshly in the belief that they need to be hardened for battle.

With a confrontation with Lt. Col. Baseman who is afraid for him and his mental state, Connell is offered the chance to go back into the lines. He volunteers to return to the fighting, but even with Peggy, now pregnant and fearing for him, releasing him from his promise, Connell finds it difficult to become the warrior he once was. After freezing in combat, he eventually takes charge of his unit and leads them successfully in a raid against a Japanese island stronghold.

Cast

 Chad Everett as Jack Connell  
 Marilyn Devin as Peggy Sanford  
 Dean Jagger as Lt. Col. Baseman  
 Bobby Troup as Lt. Overman  
 Claude Akins as Capt. Mason  
 Gene Hackman as Sgt. Tweed  
 James Best as Sgt. Carnavan  
 Norman Alden as Sgt. Schmidtmer  
 Bobs Watson as Sgt. Maypole  
 Ken Swofford as O'Brien  
 Ray Reese as Hawkins  
 Garry Goodgion as Karl  
 Robert Austin as Adams  
 Clint Ritchie as Sgt. Slater  
 Stephen Roberts as Pres. Franklin D. Roosevelt

Production
First to Fight was shot at Camp Pendleton Marine Base, Oceanside, California, and in the San Fernando Valley at the Bell Ranch and Africa U.S.A. Park, a wildlife tourist attraction in Boca Raton, Florida. Most of the equipment matched period pieces from World War II and helped to make the film more authentic.

Footage from Casablanca (1942) was also incorporated in First to Fight.

Reception
First to Fight was notable in the number of major actors who were featured in starring and supporting roles. Although Marilyn Devin would star in only a few films, she went on to a career as a TV news anchor.  Chad Everett appearing as one of the last contract actors in Hollywood was ably backed up by Oscar-winner Dean Jagger, and future Oscar-winner Gene Hackman, actor and Jazz singer Bobby Troup, Claude Akins and James Best, both of whom would later find fame as TV stars.

See also
List of American films of 1967

References
Notes

Bibliography

 Brady, James. Hero of the Pacific: The Life of Marine Legend John Basilone. New York: Wiley, 2010. .

External links
 
 
 

1967 films
1967 war films
American war films
Films directed by Christian Nyby
Pacific War films
Films about the United States Marine Corps
Warner Bros. films
1960s English-language films
1960s American films